Benedict Hyman Gross is an American mathematician who is a professor at the University of California San Diego, the George Vasmer Leverett Professor of Mathematics Emeritus at Harvard University, and former Dean of Harvard College.

He is known for his work in number theory, particularly the Gross–Zagier theorem on L-functions of elliptic curves, which he researched with Don Zagier.

Education and Professional career
Gross graduated from The Pingry School, a leading independent school in New Jersey, in 1967 as the valedictorian. In 1971, he graduated Phi Beta Kappa from Harvard University.  He then received an M.Sc. from Oxford University as a Marshall Scholar in 1974 before returning to Harvard and completing his Ph.D. in 1978, under John Tate.

After holding faculty positions at Princeton University and Brown University, Gross became a tenured professor at Harvard in 1985 and remained there subsequently, as Dean of Harvard College from 2003 to 2007.

Benedict Gross was the mathematical consultant for the 1980 film It's My Turn containing the famous scene in which actress Jill Clayburgh, portraying a mathematics professor,  impeccably proves the snake lemma.

Awards and honors
Gross is a 1986 MacArthur Fellow.

Gross, Zagier, and Dorian M. Goldfeld won the Cole Prize of the American Mathematical Society in 1987 for their work on the Gross–Zagier theorem. In 2012 he became a fellow of the American Mathematical Society.

Gross was elected as a fellow of the American Academy of Arts and Sciences in 1992 and as a member of the National Academy of Sciences in 2004.
He was elected to the American Philosophical Society in 2017.

He was named as a Harvard University Professor from 2011 to 2016 for his distinguished scholarship and professional work.

Major publications
 Gross, Benedict H.; Harris, Joe. Real algebraic curves. Ann. Sci. École Norm. Sup. (4) 14 (1981), no. 2, 157–182.
 Gross, Benedict H. Heights and the special values of L-series. Number theory (Montreal, Que., 1985), 115–187, CMS Conf. Proc., 7, Amer. Math. Soc., Providence, RI, 1987.
 Gross, Benedict H. A tameness criterion for Galois representations associated to modular forms (mod p). Duke Math. J. 61 (1990), no. 2, 445–517.
 Gross, Benedict H.; Prasad, Dipendra. On the decomposition of a representation of SOn when restricted to SOn−1. Canad. J. Math. 44 (1992), no. 5, 974–1002.
 Gross, Benedict H.; Zagier, Don B. Heegner points and derivatives of L-series. Invent. Math. 84 (1986), no. 2, 225–320.
 Gross, B.; Kohnen, W.; Zagier, D. Heegner points and derivatives of L-series. II. Math. Ann. 278 (1987), no. 1-4, 497–562.
 Gan, Wee Teck; Gross, Benedict H.; Prasad, Dipendra. Symplectic local root numbers, central critical L values, and restriction problems in the representation theory of classical groups. Sur les conjectures de Gross et Prasad. I. Astérisque No. 346 (2012), 1–109.

See also
Fat Chance: Probability from 0 to 1
Gross–Koblitz formula

References

External links
 Benedict Gross's Harvard University homepage
 
 
 

1950 births
Living people
20th-century American mathematicians
21st-century American mathematicians
Number theorists
Harvard University alumni
Alumni of the University of Oxford
Princeton University faculty
Trustees of the Institute for Advanced Study
Brown University faculty
Harvard University faculty
MacArthur Fellows
Fellows of the American Academy of Arts and Sciences
Fellows of the American Mathematical Society
Members of the United States National Academy of Sciences
Marshall Scholars
Members of the American Philosophical Society